Leuderic II (died 754) was a bishop of Urgell in Catalonia. He succeeded the martyred bishop Nambaudus and was succeeded after his death by bishop Esteve. Little else is known of him.

References 

Bishops of Urgell
Year of birth unknown
754 deaths